Zanzibar Ocean View Football Club is a football (soccer) club from Zanzibar based in Unguja. They were formed in 2010 as a breakaway side from Miembeni S.C.

Achievements
Zanzibar Premier League : 1
 2010.

Performance in CAF competitions
CAF Champions League: 1 appearance
2011 – Preliminary Round

Current Players

External links
Team profile – Soccerway.com

Football clubs in Tanzania
Zanzibari football clubs
2010 establishments in Tanzania